Harmon School may refer to:

Harmon School (Millsboro, Delaware), listed on the National Register of Historic Places in Sussex County, Delaware
Harmon School (Fallon, Nevada), listed on the National Register of Historic Places in Churchill County, Nevada